John Bukovsky (Slovak: Ján Bukovský), SVD, named Ján Fukna at birth (18 January 1924 – 18 December 2010), was a Slovakia-born American prelate of the Catholic Church who worked in the diplomatic service of the Holy See.

Biography
Bukovsky was born in Cerová, Slovakia, on 18 January 1924, the fourth of six children. He entered the Society of the Divine Word seminary in Nitra, Czechoslovakia, in 1939. The Society sent him to the United States for additional studies in 1947. Ordered to return to Czechoslovakia when the new Communist government revoked his passport, he instead with the help of Chicago Mayor Richard J. Daley reentered the U.S. from Canada as a legal immigrant. He was ordained in December 1950 in Techny, Illinois, as a priest of the Divine Word Missionaries and became a U.S. citizen a few years later. In 1952 he received a degree in sacred theology from Catholic University. He then pursued an academic career, teaching at St. Mary's Seminary in Techny for 14 years and studying at the University of Chicago's Oriental Institute and earning a degree from the Pontifical Biblical Institute in Rome in 1966.

In the 1970s, while Bukovsky served a six-year term in the office of the General Council of the Society of the Divine Word, an elected position, Cardinal Agostino Casaroli recruited him to join the Secretariat of State. While working there Bukovsky frequently lunched with the pope. He was also named to the Curia's Council for Public Affairs and made several trips to explore relations between the Holy See and the countries of Eastern Europe. For 17 years he headed the Secretariat's Eastern Europe desk.

On 18 August 1990, Pope John Paul II named him titular archbishop of Tabalta and Apostolic Nuncio to Romania. He was the first Nuncio to Romania of the post-Communist era.

On 20 December 1994, he was appointed the first papal representative to the Russian Federation.  Bukovsky had some significant successes there, regaining partial control of the former seminary in St. Petersburg.

Bukovsky retired upon the appointment of his successor, Giorgio Zur on 29 January 2000. Pope John Paul named him a member of the Pontifical Council for Promoting Christian Unity and a consultor to the Secretariat of State on 6 June 2002.

He died in Techny on 18 December 2010.

Writings 
 Spomienky spoločníka. Nitra : Spoločnosť krásneho slova, 2006. . S. 146.
 Chiesa del martirio, chiesa della diplomazia. : Memorie tra Cecoslovacchia e Vaticano. Bologna: EDB, 2009. . S. 104.

References

External links

 Catholic Hierarchy: Archbishop John Bukovsky, S.V.D.
 

20th-century American Roman Catholic titular archbishops
1924 births
2010 deaths
Divine Word Missionaries Order
Apostolic Nuncios to Romania
Apostolic Nuncios to Russia
Czechoslovak emigrants to the United States
People from Senica District